James P. O'Neill (died March 3, 1993) was an American baseball pitcher who is most notable for winning the 1952 College World Series Most Outstanding Player award while a senior at College of the Holy Cross. He is the only person from College of the Holy Cross to ever win the award. He was inducted into the College of the Holy Cross Hall of Fame in 1980. O'Neill also played basketball at Holy Cross and played on the 1949-50 team with future hall of fame guard Bob Cousy which set the school record for wins (27).

References

Year of birth missing
1993 deaths
All-American college baseball players
Baseball players from Columbus, Ohio
Holy Cross Crusaders baseball players
Holy Cross Crusaders men's basketball players
College World Series Most Outstanding Player Award winners
Baseball pitchers
American men's basketball players